Bowthorpe Marsh is a   Local Nature Reserve  in Norwich in Norfolk. It is owned and managed by Norwich City Council.

This site adjacent to the River Yare has unimproved grassland, tall fen, a seasonal pond and drainage ditches, which have aquatic plants such as reed sweet-grass.

There is access by a footpath from Doddermans Way.

References

Local Nature Reserves in Norfolk